The Vaughan Stars were a Junior ice hockey team based in Vaughan, Ontario, Canada.  They played in the Greater Metro Junior A Hockey League.

History
The Stars were announced after the Spring Draft in May 2011.  The Stars were a new team in Vaughan, after the Vaughan Wild moved and became the Lefroy Wave.

On September 10, 2011, the Stars played their first game.  The game was on the road against the Toronto Canada Moose, in Thornhill, Ontario, and the Stars won 4-2.

The Stars began the season with an outstanding 11-4-1 record, good enough for sixth place in the league. Every season the GMHL holds a prospects tournament in Elliot Lake that is mandatory for the top seven teams in the league, in 2011 from November 22 until 24.  On November 21, the Stars informed the league that they were refusing to travel to the tournament at the last moment.  The league warned the Stars of disciplinary action.  The Stars defaulted their November 25 game against the Lefroy Wave and November 26 game against the Bradford Rattlers.

On November 28, 2011, the league's owners voted and chose to revoke the membership of the Stars from the league and placed all its players on free agent status.  This is the first and only time a team in the GMHL has been stripped of its franchise.

Season-by-Season Standings

References

External links
Stars Webpage
GMHL Webpage

Ice hockey teams in Ontario